General elections were held in Jordan on 27 April 1967. As political parties were banned at the time, all candidates ran as independents. Voter turnout was 70.0%.

References

Elections in Jordan
General election
Jordan
Jordan
Election and referendum articles with incomplete results
Jordan